The Naval Historical Team (NHT) was established by the U.S. Navy in 1949. It was a group of German naval officers under American orders to reappraise the naval war history of World War II from the German perspective. The group was under control of the Office of Naval Intelligence. At the end of 1952, the NHT was disbanded, but was re-established in Karlsruhe in 1954.

Under the leadership of Captain Arthur H. Graubart, Chief of Naval Intelligence in Germany, the NHT first met on 9 April 1949 in Bremerhaven. The staff included Generaladmiral a. D. Otto Schniewind, Vizeadmiral a. D. Friedrich Ruge, Vizeadmiral a. D. Hellmuth Heye, Konteradmiral a. D. Gerhard Wagner and Oberst a. D. Gaul. Temporarily it was further augmented by Konteradmiral a. D. Eberhard Godt, Kapitän zur See a. D. Hans-Rudolf Rösing and Fregattenkapitän a. D. Karl-Adolf Zenker.

The group considered itself an incubator of a future West German navy, an aspiration culminating in Ruge's appointment as the first inspector of the Bundesmarine, with Wagner as his deputy, in 1957. The primary interest of the U.S. Navy was in the German war experiences fighting against the Soviet Navy, which the U.S. Navy wanted to leverage in a possible war at sea with the Soviet Union. The findings of the NHT significantly influenced the conception of the new Bundesmarine formed in 1956.

Notes

References

 Corum, James S. (2011). Rearming Germany Volume 64. Brill. .
 Greiner, Christian (1982): "Operational History (German) Section" und "Naval Historical Team". Deutsches militärstrategisches Denken im Dienst der amerikanischen Streitkräfte von 1946 bis 1950." In: Militärgeschichtliches Forschungsamt (Hrsg.): Militärgeschichte. Probleme - Thesen - Wege. Stuttgart.
Peifer, Douglas (2002): "Forerunners to the West German Bundesmarine: The Klose Fast Patrol Group, the Naval Historical Team Bremerhaven, and the U.S. Navy's Labor Service Unit (B)". In: International Journal of Naval History, Vol.1, No. 1

Bibliography 

 Peifer, Douglas (2002), The Three German Navies; Dissolution, Transition, and New Beginnings, 1945-1960, University of Florida Press, ISBN 0-8130-2552-2

 Peifer, Douglas (2011).·“Establishing the Bundesmarine.” In Rearming Germany, ed. James S. Corum. Boston; Leiden: Brill, 2011. ISBN 978-90-04-20320
 Peifer, Douglas (2005).“From Enemy to Ally: Reconciliation Made Real in the Post-War German Maritime Sphere,” War in History vol. 12, nr. 2, 202-24.

External links
 Bundesarchiv Bestand ZA 4 Naval Historical Team

Intel
Nav
Military units and formations established in 1949
Naval history of Germany